George Amos Poole III (8 April 1907 – 21 March 1990) was an American printer who formed an important collection of manuscripts and examples of early printing that was acquired by David A. Randall for the Lilly Library at Indiana University.

Poole attended the University of Chicago and Yale University and went on to direct the Chicago printers Poole Brothers. He was a trustee of the Newberry Library and the University of Chicago. He married Ellen Stuart on 20 September 1930.

References

External links
The Poole Collection at the Lilly Library.

People from Chicago
1907 births
1990 deaths
American printers
Yale University alumni
Lilly Library
American book and manuscript collectors
20th-century American businesspeople